Isabella of France (2 March 1241 – 17 April 1271) was Queen of Navarre by marriage to Theobald II of Navarre, a daughter of Louis IX of France and Margaret of Provence.

Life 

At the All Saints Parlement in 1254, Theobald of Navarre requested Isabella's hand in marriage. In an attempt to resolve the inheritance of Navarre, Louis declined Theobald's request until he reconciled with his sister, Blanche of Brittany. Upon the reconciliation, Louis agreed to Isabella marrying Theobald.  The Archbishop of Rouen celebrated the marriage between Isabella and Theobald II, King of Navarre and Count of Champagne, on 6 April 1255 in Melun.  Isabelle became Queen consort of Navarre.

Together with her husband and her father, the very pious Isabella travelled with the Eighth Crusade in July 1270. Her father died there in August of the same year. Then, in December, Isabella's husband died of an epidemic while in Sicily. After the deaths of both her father and husband, Isabella returned to France and lived in Provence until her death only two months later in 1271.

Isabella is buried next to her husband in Provins.

Ancestors

References

Sources

External links

1241 births
1271 deaths
Navarrese royal consorts
Countesses of Champagne
French princesses
House of Capet
13th-century French people
13th-century French women
13th-century nobility from the Kingdom of Navarre
Daughters of kings
Children of Louis IX of France
Christians of the Eighth Crusade